Melanie Nicholls-King is a Canadian actress, perhaps best known for playing Cheryl in the drama series The Wire, and for her portrayal of Officer Noelle Williams in the drama series Rookie Blue.

Personal life
Nicholls-King is from Toronto.  She is married and has a son.

Filmography

Film

Television

External links
Official Site

Melanie Nicholls-King on Twitter
Melanie Nicholls-King on Facebook
Melanie Nicholls-King on Instagram

References

Black Canadian actresses
Canadian people of Barbadian descent
Canadian film actresses
Living people
Year of birth missing (living people)
Canadian television actresses
Actresses from Toronto
20th-century Canadian actresses
21st-century Canadian actresses
Canadian voice actresses